John Brogden was a Victorian-era manufacturing jeweller.

He was apprenticed to a London firm of watch and clockmakers, becoming a partner in 1831 with James William Garland, with a workshop in Bridgewater Square. From 1842 to 1864 he was a partner in the firm of Watherston and Brogden (est. 1798), goldsmiths of 16 Henrietta Street, Covent Garden. In 1864 Brogden took over the business and operated under his own name until 1880. Between 1881 and 1885 he worked as an 'art goldsmith' at the Grand Hotel Buildings in Charing Cross.

Besides exhibiting jewellery at the 1851 Great Exhibition, John Brogden won awards at various exhibitions in Paris and London from the 1850s to the 1870s.  His designs were inspired by archaeological and Renaissance objects and he enjoyed royal patronage.

References

Year of death missing
British jewellers
Year of birth missing